The Donn Handicap was an American Thoroughbred horse race run annually from 1959 through 2016 at Gulfstream Park in Hallandale Beach, Florida. A race for horses age four and older, it was contested on turf from inception through 1964 at a distance of a mile and one-half. From 1965 onwards it was raced on dirt at a mile and one-eighth with the exception of 1976 when the distance was set at seven furlongs (7/8 mile).

The race was named after the Donn family, who for many years owned and operated the racetrack. 

Three horses have won the race twice. Inaugurated at a distance of a mile and a half on turf, the only horse to ever win the race twice at that distance was One-Eyed-King who did it back-to-back in 1959 and 1960. In 1965, future U.S. Racing Hall of Fame inductee Gun Bow won the first edition at its present distance of one and one-eighth miles on dirt. Under those same race conditions, Pistols and Roses won it back-to-back in 1993 and 1994 as did another Hall of Fame inductee Cigar in the two ensuing years. 

A total of three horses that have won the Donn Handicap went on to be named either the Eclipse Award for American Horse of the Year or American Champion Older Male Horse that year: Saint Liam, Skip Away and Cigar. In addition, reigning Horse of the Year Invasor won the Donn in 2007 prior to taking the Dubai World Cup.

The final running of the Donn Handicap took place on February 6, 2016.

From 2017, the Donn Handicap was replaced on the Gulfstream racing calendar by the Pegasus World Cup.

Records 
Speed record:
 1-1/8 miles on dirt: 1:46.40, Jumping Hill (1979)
 1-1/2 miles on turf: 2:25.80, One-Eyed-King (1959) & Jay Fox (1962)

Most wins by a horse:
 2 - Cigar (1995, 1996)
 2 - Pistols and Roses (1993, 1994)
 2 - One-Eyed-King  (1959, 1960)

Most wins by a trainer:
 5 - Todd Pletcher (2003, 2010, 2013, 2015, 2016)

Most wins by a jockey:
 6 - Jerry Bailey (1988, 1995, 1996, 1998, 2001, 2004)

Most wins by an owner:
 2 - Cain Hoy Stable (1959, 1960)
 2 - Brae Burn Farm (1961, 1962)
 2 - Due Process Stable (1981, 1983)
 2 - Allen E. Paulson (1995, 1996)
 2 - Shadwell Stable (2007, 2009)
 2 - Willis Family Stable (1993, 1994)
 2 - Twin Creeks Racing Stable (2013, 2015)

Winners

See also 
 Donn Handicap "top three finishers" and starters

External link
 The Donn Handicap at Pedigree Query

References 

 The Donn Handicap at the NTRA

Discontinued horse races
Open mile category horse races
Turf races in the United States
1959 establishments in Florida
2010s disestablishments in Florida
Grade 1 stakes races in the United States
Horse races in Florida
Gulfstream Park
Recurring sporting events established in 1959
Recurring sporting events disestablished in 2017